Carolina Barillas-Mury is the chair of the Mosquito Immunity and Vector Competence Section and Director of the Malaria Research Program at the National Institute of Allergy and Infectious Diseases of the National Institutes of Health. She studies how mosquitos transmit diseases like malaria, and in recognition of her research, she has been elected to the National Academy of Sciences.

Early life and education
Barillas-Mury was born in 1961 in Guatemala. She learned English when she attended high school run by American nuns.

Barillas-Mury graduated from the Universidad del Valle de Guatemala in 1981 with a B.S. in biology. She received her M.D. from Universidad Francisco Marroquín de Guatemala in 1985. There were no graduate programs in Guatemala, so in 1987, she moved to the United States to do a PhD at the University of Arizona in the lab of Michael Wells, where she studied the process of enzymatic blood digestion by Aedes aegypti. She graduated in 1992 and stayed until 1993 to do postdoctoral research. In 1994, she joined the lab of Fotis Kafatos at Harvard University. She then moved to Germany to do research at the European Molecular Biology Laboratory.

Career
Barillas-Mury was hired as an assistant professor at Colorado State University’s department of microbiology, immunology, and pathology in 1998. There, she began working to develop a model of cellular invasion of parasites. She moved to the National Institutes of Health in 2003.

She is the head of the Mosquito Immunity and Vector Competence Section at the National Institute of Allergy and Infectious Diseases. There, she studies how Plasmodium parasites interact with the mosquito immune system, and how this affects the transmission of malaria.

She is an editor of the Proceedings of the National Academy of Sciences.

Awards and honors
2010 Bailey K. Ashford Medal of the American Society of Tropical Medicine and Hygiene
2013 Sanofi/Pasteur Award in Tropical and Neglected Diseases
2014 elected member of the National Academy of Sciences
2021 elected member of the National Academy of Medicine

References

1961 births
Living people
American microbiologists
American women biologists
Guatemalan biologists
Guatemalan women scientists
Members of the United States National Academy of Sciences
Fellows of the American Society of Tropical Medicine and Hygiene
Malariologists
20th-century biologists
20th-century women scientists
21st-century biologists
21st-century women scientists
Women entomologists
21st-century American women
Members of the National Academy of Medicine